Gręziniec (also Grzęziniec) is a 5.5-km river of northwestern Poland, with its headwaters in the Ueckermünde Heath.  It flows through the city of Szczecin and becomes a left tributary of the Oder.

Rivers of Poland
Rivers of West Pomeranian Voivodeship